Ángel Luis Rodríguez (born 15 February 1976) is a retired Panamanian football midfielder.

Club career
Pito Rodríguez played in the youth teams of Uruguyan giants Nacional and Colombian outfit Independiente Santa Fe and started his senior career at Ejecutivo Jrs., played for San Francisco and Tauro and returned to San Francisco in December 2002. While at Tauro, he went to Italy for a trial with Empoli in 1998.

He had a spell abroad on loan at Salvadoran side FAS in 1999, but left the club citing urgent family matters while denying any involvement in a Salvadoran road accident in which a person died and subsequently fleeing Salvadoran law. In summer 2005, he went to play alongside compatriot Juan Carlos Cubillas for Ecuadoran second division team Santa Rita.

He also played for Sporting San Miguelito and Árabe Unido, whom he joined a second time in summer 2009 from Sporting.

He retired in July 2011.

International career
He played for the Panama U23 team in the 1997 Central American Games.

Rodríguez made his debut for Panama in a January 1995 UNCAF Nations Cup match against Nicaragua and has earned a total of 57 caps, scoring 3 goals. He represented his country in 18 FIFA World Cup qualification matches and was a member of the 2005 CONCACAF Gold Cup team, who finished second in the tournament.

His final international was a January 2010 friendly match against Chile.

International goals
Scores and results list Panama's goal tally first.

Managerial career
After retiring as a player in July 2011, Rodríguez was named assistant to manager Jair Palacios at Árabe Unido. He was appointed coach of Árabe Unido Reserves in summer 2014.

References

External links

1976 births
Living people
Association football midfielders
Panamanian footballers
Panama international footballers
1995 UNCAF Nations Cup players
1997 UNCAF Nations Cup players
2001 UNCAF Nations Cup players
2005 CONCACAF Gold Cup players
San Francisco F.C. players
Tauro F.C. players
C.D. FAS footballers
Sporting San Miguelito players
C.D. Árabe Unido players
Panamanian expatriate footballers
Expatriate footballers in El Salvador
Expatriate footballers in Ecuador
Central American Games silver medalists for Panama
Central American Games medalists in football